Petrovsky (masculine) and its feminine form Petrovskaya are Russian-language surnames. People with the surname include:

People 
Adolf Petrovsky (1887–1937), Soviet diplomat
Boris Petrovsky (1908–2004), Soviet surgeon and politician
Grigory Petrovsky (1878–1958), Ukrainian revolutionary
Ivan Petrovsky (1901–1973), mathematician
Kyra Petrovskaya Wayne (1918–2018), Russian-American writer
Leonid Petrovsky (1897–1941), Soviet lieutenant general
Nikolai Petrovsky (1837–1908), diplomat
Yohanan Petrovsky-Shtern (born 1962), Russian-American historian, philologist and essayist

Fictional characters 
Aleksandr Petrovsky, fictional character played by Mikhail Baryshnikov in Sex and the City

Slavic-language surnames
Russian-language surnames